Phyllonorycter klemannella is a moth of the family Gracillariidae. It is known from all of Europe, except Greece.

The wingspan is 7.5-9.5 mm. The forewings are shining
ochreous-orange, sometimes much mixed with dark fuscous ; a fascia at 1/4, another at 1/2, two posterior costal and two dorsal wedge-shaped spots silvery-whitish, anteriorly blackish-margined
a small round black apical spot. Hindwings are rather dark grey.

The larvae feed on Alnus glutinosa and Alnus incana. They mine the leaves of their host plant. They create a lower-surface tentiform mine between two side veins, often quite far from the midrib. There are many weak folds. There may be several mines in a single leaf. Pupation takes place in a white cocoon within the mine. The cocoon is attached to the roof of the mine and is free from frass, which is concentrated in a corner of the mine, opposite of the cocoon.

References

External links
Lepiforum.de

klemannella
Moths described in 1781
Moths of Europe